John Olney (1932 – April 14, 2015) was a medical doctor and a professor of psychiatry, pathology, and immunology at the Washington University School of Medicine. He is known for his work on brain damage. He coined the term excitotoxicity in his 1969 paper published in Science. Olney's lesions are named after him. In 1996 he was elected to the Institute of Medicine of the United States National Academy of Sciences. He had campaigned for greater regulation of monosodium glutamate (MSG), aspartame and other excitotoxins for over twenty years. He died at his residence on April 14, 2015 at the age of 83.

References

External links
University of Iowa Medical School: Alumni Interview: John Olney, M.D.
Washington University, Department of Psychiatry: John W. Olney, M.D.

American medical researchers
American neuroscientists
1932 births
2015 deaths
American psychiatrists
Members of the National Academy of Medicine